The first season of the original Mission: Impossible originally aired Saturdays at 9:00–10:00 pm (EST) on CBS from September 17, 1966 to January 7, 1967 and at 8:30–9:30 pm (EST) from January 14 to April 22, 1967.

Cast

Main 
Steven Hill as Dan Briggs
Barbara Bain as Cinnamon Carter
Greg Morris as Barney Collier
Peter Lupus as Willy Armitage

Recurring 
Martin Landau as Rollin Hand

a All Episodes except Episode 23 "Action!"
b Entire season (does not appear in episodes 11, 13, 16, 18)
c Entire season (does not appear in episodes 9, 13, 18)
d Entire season (does not appear in episodes 9, 11-14, 16)
e (Does not appear in episodes 12, 14)

Episodes

References

1
1966 American television seasons
1967 American television seasons